Alfonso Vazquez Villar (born June 16, 2002) is an American professional soccer player who plays as a forward.

Career

High school
Vazquez holds Connecticut’s all-time high school goal scoring record. He broke a 31-year-old state record for goals scored in a career. Vazquez scored 21 goals as a freshman, 31 as a sophomore, 42 as a junior, and 55 as a senior to bring his career total to 149 goals. He was named All-New England and All-American following his senior season, is a four-time first-team all Eastern Connecticut Conference player, and a three-time all-state honoree.

Professional
Following an open tryout, Vazquez was signed by USL Championship side Hartford Athletic. At the age of 17, he was the club's youngest-ever signing. He made his professional debut on July 25, 2020, appearing as an 87th-minute substitute in a 3-2 win over Philadelphia Union II. He scored his first goal for Hartford Athletic on August 2, 2020 in a 4-1 win vs. Loudoun United. 

Vazquez re-signed with Hartford for the 2021 season on December 17, 2020.

References

External links
Hartford Athletic bio
USL Championship bio

2002 births
Living people
Soccer players from Connecticut
American soccer players
American sportspeople of Mexican descent
Association football forwards
Hartford Athletic players
USL Championship players
People from Windham, Connecticut